The Monumento a la Madre is installed in Guadalajara, in the Mexican state of Jalisco. It features an indigenous woman looking at the sky while she covers her child. It is a bronze statue that lies on a volcanic rock base. It lies along Plaza 10 de Mayo and it was inaugurated in 1956.

References

External links

 

1956 establishments in Mexico
1956 sculptures
Bronze sculptures in Mexico
Monuments and memorials in Jalisco
Monuments and memorials to women
Outdoor sculptures in Guadalajara
Sculptures of children
Sculptures of women in Mexico
Statues in Jalisco